Thomas Michael Shopay (born February 21, 1945 in Bristol, Connecticut) is a former Major League Baseball player. Shopay was a left-handed hitter who played outfielder for the New York Yankees (1967, 1969) and Baltimore Orioles (1971–72, 1975–77).

Professional career
Shopay attended Bristol Eastern High School in Bristol, CT. He was attending Dean College in Franklin, MA when he was selected by the New York Yankees in the 34th round (624th overall) of the 1965 Major League Baseball Draft. He was picked in the Rule 5 draft by the Baltimore Orioles on December 1, 1969. He never had more than 74 at-bats in any of his seven seasons in the majors.

Although only a .201 career hitter (62-for-309) with 3 home runs and 20 RBI in 253 games over 7 seasons, Shopay was good defensively, recording a .993 fielding percentage, committing only 1 error in 151 total chances in 525 innings at all three outfield positions and catcher. This occurred September 23, 1967 as a member of the New York Yankees in the 6th inning against the Minnesota Twins at Metropolitan Stadium.

References

External links
Career statistics and player information from Baseball Reference, or Baseball Reference (Minors), or Baseball Almanac, or Retrosheet, or Pura Pelota

1945 births
Living people
Águilas del Zulia players
American expatriate baseball players in Venezuela
Baltimore Orioles players
Baseball players from Connecticut
Binghamton Triplets players
Bridgeport Purple Knights baseball players
Columbus Clippers players
Dean College alumni
Gold Coast Suns (baseball) players
Greensboro Yankees players
Major League Baseball outfielders
New York Yankees players
People from Bristol, Connecticut
Rochester Red Wings players
Syracuse Chiefs players
University of Bridgeport alumni
American expatriate baseball players in Italy
Fortitudo Baseball Bologna players